William Alexander Caruthers (1802–1846) was an American novelist.

Biography
William Alexander Caruthers was born in 1802 in Rockbridge County, Virginia. His uncle, Archibald Alexander, served as the fourth President of Hampden–Sydney College. He was educated at Washington College (now Washington and Lee University) and later in medicine at the University of Pennsylvania School of Medicine. In 1837 he moved to Savannah, Georgia, where he resided until his death in 1846.

Career
Caruthers' first novel, The Kentuckian In New York, published in 1834, is important for expressing skepticism about slavery, as well as arguing that termination was impractical at that point. The novel includes a subplot about a narrowly avoided slave revolt, which was likely influenced by Nat Turner's rebellion. Some credit a short inclusion of a letter by a slave in Arabic as influencing a similar subplot in Edgar Allan Poe's Narrative of Arthur Gordon Pym (1838). His later and somewhat better known works include The Cavaliers of Virginia, or the Recluse of Jamestown and The Knights of the Horse Shoe, a romanticized retelling of the historic Knights of the Golden Horseshoe Expedition, also known as the Transmontane Expedition.

Bibliography
The Kentuckian in New-York; or, The Adventures of Three Southerns, by a Virginian (1834)
Cavaliers of Virginia; or, The Recluse of Jamestown. An Historical Romance of the Old Dominion (1834–1835, released in two parts)
The Knights of the Golden Horse-Shoe, a Traditionary Tale of the Cocked Hat Gentry in the Old Dominion (1835)

References

Further reading

External links
 
 
 The Kentuckian in New-York at the Internet Archive
 The Knights of the Horse-Shoe at the University of North Carolina's Documenting the American South archives

19th-century American novelists
1802 births
1846 deaths
Washington and Lee University alumni
Perelman School of Medicine at the University of Pennsylvania alumni
American male novelists